Euxoa bochus is a moth of the family Noctuidae first described by Herbert Knowles Morrison in 1874. It is found in western North America, from Vancouver Island, south to southern Utah and northern New Mexico, east to central Colorado, Wyoming and the Cypress Hills area of south-western Saskatchewan. It is also present in Manitoba and British Columbia.

The wingspan is 32–36 mm. Adults are on wing from July to October. There is one generation per year.

References

Euxoa
Moths of North America
Moths described in 1874